Ban Tian Yao (pronounced ) is a very rare Wuyi Oolong with a light smokey taste.

References
 Babelcarp on Ban Tian Yao

Wuyi tea
Oolong tea
Chinese teas
Chinese tea grown in Fujian